Horasan, is a town and district of Erzurum Province in the Eastern Anatolia region of Turkey. The mayor is Abdulkadir Aydın (SP).

In 2008 the population of the town was 17,661 while that of the Horasan district was 43,852.

Horasan is located on the east of Erzurum Province, and borders the provinces of Ağrı and Kars.

Etymology
Horasan is also one of the spellings of the Khorasan (or Greater Khorasan), which is a region in north east Persia with historical importance, and it is also the source of the name of the town as the first settlers of the town migrated from this region.

Neighbourhoods

 Ağıllı
 Akçataş
 Akçatoprak
 Alagöz
 Aliçeyrek
 Aras
 Ardı
 Arpaçayır
 Aşağıaktaş
 Aşağıbademözü
 Azap
 Bahçe
 Bulgurlu
 Çamlıkale
 Çamurlu
 Çayırdüzü
 Çiftlik
 Dalbaşı
 Danişment
 Değirmenler
 Dikili
 Döllek
 Dönertaş
 Eğertaşlar
 Gerek
 Gündeğer
 Güzelyayla
 Hacıahmet
 Hacıhalil
 Harçlı
 Hasanbey
 Haydarlı
 Hızardere
 Hızırilyas
 İğdeliİncesu
 Kadıcelal
 Kalender
 Karabıyık
 Karacaören
 Karaçuha
 Karapınar
 Kaynarca
 Kemerli
 Kepenek
 KırıkKırkdikme
 Kırkgözeler
 Kırklar
 Kızılca
 Kızlarkale
 Küçükkonak
 Kükürtlü
 Mollaahmet
 Mollamelik
 Muratbağı
 Pınarlı
 Pirali
 Pirhasan
 Saçlık
 Sekman
 Şeyhyusuf
 Tahirhoca
 Tavşancık
 Teknecik
 Yarboğaz
 Yaylacık
 Yazılıtaş
 Yeşildere
 Yeşilöz
 Yeşilyurt
 Yıldıran
 Yukarıbademözü
 Yukarıhorum
 Yukarıtahirhoca
 Yürükatlı
 Yüzören

References

Populated places in Erzurum Province
Districts of Erzurum Province
Kurdish settlements in Turkey